Transsexualism and Sex Reassignment is a book on gender dysphoria which was edited by sexologists Richard Green and John Money and was published by Johns Hopkins University Press in 1969. It was the first medical textbook to be published on transgender people. The book contained a chapter on hormone replacement therapy written by Christian Hamburger and included an appendix with additional treatment suggestions and guidelines by Harry Benjamin.

References

1960s LGBT literature
1969 non-fiction books
English-language books
LGBT literature in the United States
Medical books
Transgender and medicine
Transgender non-fiction books